A celebrity is a person who is widely recognised in a given society and commands a degree of public and media attention. The word is derived from the Latin celebrity, from the adjective celeber ("famous," "celebrated"). Being a celebrity is often one of the highest degrees of notability, although the word notable is mistaken to be synonymous with the title celebrity, fame, prominence etc. As in Wikipedia, articles written about notable people doesn't necessarily synonymize them as a celebrity.

The following are lists of celebrities: 
Lists of gadus
List of celebrities on The Simpsons
List of celebrity guest stars on Sesame Street
List of celebrity inventors
List of celebrities with advanced degrees
List of comedians
List of dance personalities
List of dancers
List of fashion designers
List of female boxers
List of film and television directors
List of Forbes Celebrity 100 
List of League of Legends players
List of male boxers
List of musicians
List of news presenters
Lists of singers
List of singer-songwriters
List of social thinkers
Lists of sportspeople
List of stars on the Hollywood Walk of Fame
List of stars on the London Avenue of Stars
List of tattoo artists
List of television presenters
List of soul relationships
List of tik tokers
List of wrestlers
List of YouTubers